Khurshid Khan, was an officer of the Bengal Sultanate, stationed across various locations such as Bihar, Sylhet, Dhaka, North Bengal and Chittagong.

Background
According to the Muzaffar Shah's Nawabganj inscription, Khurshid's name was also Ulugh. This suggests he is of Turkic origin.

Life
Khan was known to have established many mosques throughout Eastern India. In Bihar, he constructed a mosque in Bhagalpur on 3 August 1446 under the reign of Nasiruddin Mahmud Shah.

On 19 October 1463, he built a mosque in Hatkhola, Patharkandi during the reign of Rukunuddin Barbak Shah, the Sultan of Bengal of the Ilyas Shahi dynasty. The tughra inscription, which was discovered by a farmer in nearby Anair Haor, refers to the builder as "the Great Khan, Khurshid Khan, chief of the royal palace guards". This is the earliest extant Muslim stone tablet in the Sylhet region.

On 31 May 1465, he built someone's tomb in Dhaka and referred to himself in the inscription as Majlis Khurshīd Nawbat Ghayr Maḥaliyān (مجلس خرشيد نوبت خير محليان).

It is said that he is the person who, during the reign of Habshi Sultan Shamsuddin Muzaffar Shah, built a mosque near Nawabganj on the banks of the Mahananda River. This took place on 30 December 1492 and the inscription mentions him as Majlis al-Muʿazzam wal-Mukarram Majlis Ulugh Khurshīd (مجلس المعظم والمكرم مجلس ألغ خرشيد).

During the reign of Alauddin Husayn Shah, he also constructed a mosque in Diwan Hat, Chittagong. The inscription was recently discovered in the mosque's gateway and contained tughra calligraphy.

Death
During the reign of Alauddin Husayn Shah, Muqarrab Khan ibn Chand Malik constructed a jama masjid in Murshidabad in 1503. At the end of the inscription, the writer prays and wishes well for Majlis Khurshid's akhirah suggesting that Khurshid died around this time.

See also
Haydar Ghazi
History of Sylhet
Lutfullah Shirazi

References

Rulers of Sylhet
15th-century rulers in Asia
15th-century Indian Muslims
1503 deaths
Bengal Sultanate officers